Lorraine Barbosa Martins (born April 4, 2000) is a Brazilian sprinter.

Career 
Martins first International competition came at the 2017 South American U20 Championships, where she won double gold in the 100m and 200m. Martins ran for Brazil at the 2017 IAAF World U18 Championships, finishing 4th in the 100m. She also competed at the 2018 IAAF World U20 Championships, reaching the finals in the 100m and 200m events. Martins competed at the 2019 South American U20 Championships, where she won gold in both the 100m and 200m events.

Martins competed at the 2019 World Championships in Athletics in the 200m and the 4x100m relay events but failed to make a final in both, as the relay team was disqualified after running what would have been a final qualifying place in the heats.

Martins, alongside her relay teammates, won gold in the 4x100m relay event at the 2019 Military World games.

She competed at the 2020 Summer Olympics.

Martins is missing her index and ring fingers on her left hand, making it harder to get into position in the starting blocks.

Personal bests
Her best marks are: 

100 m: 11.26 s (wind: +1.2 m/s) – Lisboa, Portugal, 10 Jun 2022
200 m: 23.06 s (wind: +1.4 m/s) – San José, Costa Rica, 20 Jul 2019

International Competitions 
DQ = disqualified

References

External links 

2000 births
Living people
Brazilian female sprinters
Pan American Games medalists in athletics (track and field)
Pan American Games gold medalists for Brazil
Athletes (track and field) at the 2019 Pan American Games
Medalists at the 2019 Pan American Games
21st-century Brazilian women